Cress (Lepidium sativum), sometimes referred to as garden cress (or curly cress) to distinguish it from similar plants also referred to as cress (from old Germanic cresso which means sharp, spicy), is a rather fast-growing, edible herb.

Garden cress is genetically related to watercress and mustard, sharing their peppery, tangy flavour and aroma. In some regions, garden cress is known as mustard and cress, garden pepper cress, pepperwort, pepper grass, or poor man's pepper.

When consumed raw, cress is a high-nutrient food containing substantial content of vitamins A, C and K and several dietary minerals.

In agriculture 
Garden cress is commercially grown in England, France, and Scandinavia.

Cultivation of cress is practical both on mass scales and on the individual scale. Garden cress is suitable for hydroponic cultivation and thrives in slightly alkaline water. In many local markets, the demand for hydroponically grown cress can exceed available supply, partially because cress leaves are not suitable for distribution in dried form, so they can only be partially preserved. Consumers commonly acquire cress as seeds or (in Europe) from markets as boxes of young live shoots.

Culinary uses 
Garden cress is added to soups, sandwiches and salads for its tangy flavour. It is also eaten as sprouts, and the fresh or dried seed pods can be used as a peppery seasoning (haloon). In the United Kingdom, cut cress shoots are commonly used in sandwiches with boiled eggs, mayonnaise and salt.

Nutrition

Raw cress is 89% water, 6% carbohydrates (including 1% dietary fiber), 3% protein and less than 1% fat (table). In a  reference quantity, raw cress supplies  of food energy and numerous nutrients in significant content, including vitamin K (516% of the Daily Value, DV), vitamin C (83% DV) and vitamin A (43% DV). Among dietary minerals, manganese levels are high (26% DV) while several others, including potassium and magnesium, are in moderate content (table).

Other uses 

Garden cress, known as chandrashoor, and the seeds, known as aaliv or aleev in Marathi, or halloon in India, are commonly used in the system of Ayurveda. It is also known as asario in India and the Middle East where it is prized as a medicinal herb, called habbat al hamra (literally red seeds) in Arabic. In the Arabian Peninsula, the seeds are traditionally mixed with custard to make a hot drink.

L. sativum is often used in experiments to teach biology to students in schools; the plant grows readily on damp paper or cotton, and its fast germination and development time makes it useful in demonstrating plant growth.

Gallery

See also 
 List of vegetables
 Watercress

References

Herbs
Leaf vegetables
Lepidium
Medicinal plants
Plants described in 1753
Plants used in Ayurveda